Guillaume Philibert, 1st Count Duhesme (7 July 1766 in Mercurey (formerly Bourgneuf), Burgundy – 20 June 1815 near Waterloo) was a French general during the Napoleonic Wars. He was a commander of the Imperial Guard.

Revolution 
Duhesme studied law and in 1792 was made colonel of a free corps by Charles-François Dumouriez, which he raised by his own means. As commander at Roermond, he held the post of Herstal, an important passage to the Netherlands, and burned the bridge of Leau after the defeat at Neerwinden on 18 March 1793. He then crossed the Schelde and at the Battle of Villeneuve rallied the fleeing infantry (6 July), for which action he was made brigadier general.

He also contributed greatly to the victory at the Fleurus on 26 July 1794 and besieged Maastricht under Kléber, and was promoted to general of division. He fought in the Vendée in 1795, and later at the Rhine, where he forced the passage over the river on 20 April 1797 below Kehl. In 1798 he was given a command in Italy under Championnet, participated at the siege of Naples and took control of Calabria and Apulia.

In 1800, Duhesme led a corps in Napoleon's Army of the Reserve in the Marengo campaign. At first this command included the divisions of Louis Boudet and Louis Henri Loison. After a brilliant campaign that included the capture of Milan and other cities, his corps was made up of Loison, Lorge and Lapoype's divisions. When Napoleon fought Melas's Austrian army at Marengo, Duhesme's corps defended the Po valley.

Empire 

Duhesme was made a count and knight of the Legion of Honour. In 1805, he led the 4th division of André Masséna's Italian Army at the Battle of Caldiero.

In 1808, Duhesme led a corps in Napoleon's ill-fated seizure of Spain. He distinguished himself in the capture of Barcelona. After he persuaded the Spanish governor to admit a convoy of sick Frenchmen, his fully armed grenadiers leapt from their stretchers and captured the castle. Later, he successfully defended the city against a Spanish blockade. In 1810, after accusations by Marshal Augereau of allowing plundering and other transgressions, he was recalled in disgrace.

In 1813, he was employed again as governor of the fortress of Kehl.  He commanded a division under Marshal Victor at La Rothière, Montereau and Arcis-sur-Aube. Following Napoleon I's first abdication in 1814, he was made Inspector General of Infantry. In 1815, he joined Napoleon after his return from Elba and was made commander of the Young Guard Division of the Imperial Guard and fought at Ligny. He was mortally wounded while defending the village of Plancenoit at the Battle of Waterloo and died on 20 June 1815.

Works and legacy 
Duhesme wrote a noted tract, Essai historique de l'infanterie légère (Historical Essay on Light Infantry) (Lyon 1806; 3. Aufl., Par. 1864)
Victor Hugo's novel Les Misérables describes Duhesme's death: "The general of the Young Guard, Duhesme, nabbed at the door of an inn in Genappe, handed over his sword to a hussar of Death, who took the sword and killed the prisoner. Victory was completed by the assassination of the vanquished."

Notes

References

French generals
French Republican military leaders of the French Revolutionary Wars
French commanders of the Napoleonic Wars
Commanders in the French Imperial Guard
French military personnel killed in the Napoleonic Wars
French military writers
People from Saône-et-Loire
1766 births
1815 deaths
French male writers
Names inscribed under the Arc de Triomphe